The  is a class of 1,500 V DC electric locomotives formerly operating in Japan.

History
They replaced the Class ED42 electric locomotives previously used on the rack-and-pinion line between these two stations.

The prototype, EF63 1, was produced in 1962 by Toshiba for testing before full production of the class started in 1963 spread between manufacturers Kawasaki, Mitsubishi and Toshiba. The class was equipped with a number of special safety features to cope with the unique conditions of operating on the 66.7‰, 6.67 % gradient of the Usui Pass. These included independent dynamic brakes on all six axles (hence the large louvres along the bodysides for heat dissipation), magnetic adhesion brakes operating directly on the rails, and mechanical locking brakes. Small wheels attached to the centre bogie were used to measure the train speed and apply the brakes in the case of run-away. The class used the same 425 kW MT52 traction motors used on the EF62s and also the EF70s.
The entire class was based at Yokokawa depot, and they were always used in pairs at the Yokokawa end of trains travelling in both directions, and were capable of operating in multiple with Class EF62 locomotives and a wide range of EMU types (including 115, 185, 189, 489 series) – hence the impressive array of jumper cables and connectors on the Karuizawa ends of the locos. Trains ascending the incline from Yokokawa were driven by the driver in the rearmost cab of the EF63 pair at the rear of the train, with the driver in the front cab of the train acting only as signal look-out.

Locos EF63 5 and EF63 9 were written off after a runaway derailment also involving two EF62s in 1975, and EF63 24 and EF63 25 were additionally built in 1976 to replace these two.

In 1978, EF63 11 and 13 were specially turned out to work an imperial train over the Usui Pass.

Following privatization of JNR, the entire fleet was transferred to JR East operation with the exception of EF63 1 and 14 operated by JR Freight.

The closure of the Yokokawa to Karuizawa section of the Shinetsu Main Line in September 1997 coinciding with the opening of the new Nagano Shinkansen marked the end of the careers of the EF63 locomotives. Before their final withdrawal, however, a number of locos (EF63 18, 19, 24, and 25) were repainted into original brown livery following their last overhauls in 1997. Incidentally, these locomotives were delivered in standard blue livery from new.

Locomotive histories

Source:

Batch differences

Preserved examples
 EF63 1 Usui Pass Railway Heritage Park, Gunma (brown livery)
 EF63 2 Karuizawa Station
 EF63 10 Usui Pass Railway Heritage Park, Gunma
 EF63 11 Usui Pass Railway Heritage Park, Gunma (operational)
 EF63 12 Usui Pass Railway Heritage Park, Gunma (operational)
 EF63 13 Cab section only at Omiya Works
 EF63 15 Nagano depot
 EF63 18 Usui Pass Railway Heritage Park, Gunma (brown livery)
 EF63 19 Nagano depot (brown livery)
 EF63 22 Privately preserved
 EF63 24 Usui Pass Railway Heritage Park, Gunma (operational)
 EF63 25 Usui Pass Railway Heritage Park, Gunma (operational)

EF63 24 and 25 are currently used to provide driver training sessions to members of the public at the Usui Pass Railway Heritage Park on a short stretch of track electrified at 750 V DC (rather than the normal 1,500 V). EF63 11 and 12 are kept as operational spares. All other preserved examples are kept as static exhibits.

See also
 Japan Railways locomotive numbering and classification

Notes

References

 
 

Electric locomotives of Japan
Bo-Bo-Bo locomotives
1500 V DC locomotives
Preserved electric locomotives
Railway locomotives introduced in 1962
Toshiba locomotives
Kawasaki locomotives
1067 mm gauge locomotives of Japan